Niktalab is an Iranian surname. Notable people with the name include:

 Ahmad NikTalab (1934–2020), Iranian poet, author, and linguist
 Babak NikTalab (born 1967), Iranian poet and writer
 Ramak NikTalab (born 1969), Iranian Translator and writer
 Poopak NikTalab (born 1970), Iranian author and literary researcher

Family Trees 

 NikTalab family tree

Surnames of Iranian origin
NikTalab family